East Riding General Hospital was a health facility in Bridlington Road, Driffield, East Riding of Yorkshire, England.

History
The facility had its origins in the Driffield Union Workhouse which was designed by John Edwin Oates and opened in 1868. An infirmary was established at the north end of the site. It became the Driffield Public Assistance Institution in 1930. During the Second World War, an emergency medical service hospital known as Driffield Base Hospital was built on the site. It joined the National Health Service as the East Riding County Hospital in 1948 and became the East Riding General Hospital in 1950. As it expanded it took over many of the old workhouse buildings and modern operating theatre facilities were also built on the site in the 1960s. After local services had transferred to the Alfred Bean Hospital, East Riding General Hospital closed in 1990. The buildings were demolished in 1992 and the site was sold for residential development.

References

Hospitals established in 1868
1868 establishments in England
Hospital buildings completed in 1868
Hospitals in the East Riding of Yorkshire
Defunct hospitals in England
Buildings and structures demolished in 1992
Demolished buildings and structures in England
Driffield